This is a list of Regions of Senegal by Human Development Index as of 2021.

See also
List of countries by Human Development Index

References 

Senegal
Senegal
Human Development Index